Ee Nagaraniki Emaindi ( What happened to this city?) is a 2018 Indian Telugu-language buddy comedy drama film written and directed by Tharun Bhascker, and produced by D. Suresh Babu under Suresh Productions. The film stars Vishwak Sen, Sai Sushanth Reddy, Abhinav Gomatam, Venkatesh Kakumanu, Anisha Ambrose, Simran Choudhary, and Galusheya Daria. The music was composed by Vivek Sagar with cinematography by Niketh Bommireddy and editing by Ravi Teja Girijala. The film released on 29 June 2018. It received positive reviews for its humour, performances, writing and dialogues.

Plot
Vivek, Karthik, Kaushik, and Uppi are childhood friends who dream of a career in filmmaking during their college days. But they eventually give up their plans and settle in other jobs. Vivek resigns his job and lives in isolation, still unable to get over his breakup with Shilpa; Karthik works as a manager in a club and plans on marrying his boss's daughter and settling in the US; Kaushik works as a dubbing artist and wants to become an actor; and Uppi works as a wedding editor. Karthik arranges a bachelor's party for four of them, where they run into Shirley, who joins them to conduct a casual promotional contest in which they narrate her their old friendship, their first short film work and Vivek's love story. Shirley invites them to an event in Goa and leaves.

After a mishap at the party, they all end up in Goa. There they run into Shirley and her friend Dasha, who offer them a place to stay. Karthik loses the engagement ring given by his boss and needs ₹5 lakhs to buy a similar one. So they decide to participate in the Goa short film festival for the prize money. Vivek does not agree to make a romantic comedy film due to his past love failure with Shilpa, but he later agrees as they do not have an alternative. Karthik handles the cinematography, Uppi edits the film, and Kaushik and Dasha act in it.  Unfortunately, Vivek could not get out of his past and gives a sad ending to the film. He later gives up on the project as he fears the negative feedback. At this time, when Vivek drank and slept, the remaining three wanted to change the sad ending, but they were caught by patrolling police and end up in a police station.

The next day while editing the film, Vivek wakes up, gets angry at them for changing his ending and yells at Karthik, who is in an online engagement. He reveals that they actually came to Goa because the drunken Karthik requested him. Karthik realizes that he is losing everything else for the social status, calls off his marriage and reconciles his friendship with Vivek. Kaushik gets the confidence to act in films, and Uppi becomes an editor. Vivek finally gets over his breakup, reflects his feelings on Shirley and becomes a cool person without anger issues. After working on a few short films, they start their first feature film, Pelli Choopulu.

Cast

Vishwak Sen as Vivek, a heartbroken man who resigns his job and isolates himself.
Sai Sushanth Reddy as Karthik, a club manager who plans to settle in the US by marrying his boss's daughter.
Abhinav Gomatam as Kaushik, a dubbing artist with aspirations of becoming an actor.
Venkatesh Kakumanu as Upender/Uppi, a wedding editor with a passion for filmmaking.
Anisha Ambrose as Shirley, a promotional contest host who becomes Vivek's love interest.
Simran Choudhary as Shilpa, Vivek's ex-girlfriend.
Galusheya Daria as Dasha, Shirley's friend and lead in Vivek's Goa short film.
Arjun as Satvik, Kaushik's nephew who gets involved in the group's antics.
Viren Thambidorai as Karthik's boss, who has his own plans for his daughter's future.
Jeevan Kumar as Vivek's uncle who is a police officer.
Revathi Nadha Pulipati as Kaushik's father.
Vijay Kumar as the owner of a camera rental store in Goa, is robbed of a vintage camera lens by this group of friends for use in their short film.
Geetha Bhaskar as Vivek's mother, who worries about her son's isolation.
Mounima as Kaushik's sister, who supports her brother's dreams.
Ranjani Sivakumar as lecturer in Vivek's college laboratory.
 Tharun Bhascker as Jury at Goa short film festival 
 Vijay Deverakonda as himself in a cameo appearance
 Gautham Vasudev Menon as himself in a cameo appearance

Soundtrack
This film has five songs composed by Vivek Sagar and was released By Aditya Music.

Release 
Ee Nagaraniki Emaindi was released worldwide on 28 June 2018.

Box office 
The film has collected $98,136 from the premiere shows in USA held on Thursday night. On Day 1 on Friday, the film has collected $81,127.The total US box office collection was $179,263.

Critical reception 
The film received positive reviews from critics.The Hindu praised the film and stated "With Ee Nagaraniki Emaindi, Tharun Bhascker Dhaassyam breaks the second-film jinx that hounds many filmmakers who've delivered an impressive first film."
The Times of India gave 3.5/5 rating and commented that: "Make no mistake, Ee Nagaraniki Emaindi belongs to Tharun Bhascker. The filmmaker's flair for comedy once again shines through and his dialogues are terrific."

123 Telugu gave 3.25/5 rating and wrote, "With Ee Nagarainiki Emaindi, Tollywood steps into the buddy comedy genre which has been rarely explored. This movie has no great story but is filled with a lot of fun and precious moments which a group of buddies share in real life."
The Hans India gave 3/5 rating and opined that the film was one of the best youthful entertainers in the recent times. "On the whole, the film is enjoyable entirely and even makes us emotional in parts," reviewer added. Idlebrain.com gave 3/5 rating and wrote, "[It] is a buddy comedy that has good moments and a slow second half!"

References

External links
 

2018 films
2010s Telugu-language films
Films shot in Telangana
Indian buddy comedy-drama films
2010s buddy comedy films
2018 comedy-drama films
Films directed by Tharun Bhascker
Suresh Productions films